The 2015–16 Irish Premier League season was the 43rd running of Basketball Ireland's premier men's basketball competition. The season featured 10 teams from across the Republic of Ireland and Northern Ireland, with the regular season beginning on 3 October 2015 and ending on 6 March 2016. With a first-place finish and a 16–2 win–loss record, UCC Demons were crowned back-to-back league champions, while 2016 National Cup honours went to Templeogue, who collected their first piece of silverware. In the season finale Champions Trophy tournament, Demons took out the title for the fourth straight year.

Teams

Regular season

Standings

Source: Basketball Ireland

Champions Trophy

Bracket

*National League Division 1 champions.

**National League Division 1 runners-up.

Quarter-finals

Source: Basketball Ireland

Semi-finals

Source: Basketball Ireland, Basketball Ireland

Final

National Cup

Round 1 (2 legs)

Round 2 (1 leg)
Winner of Series 2 vs Winner of Series 4

Semi-finals
Winner of Series 1 vs Winner of Round 2

Winner of Series 5 vs Winner of Series 3

Final

Source: Basketball Ireland, Comortais

Awards

Player of the Month

Coach of the Month

Statistics leaders
Stats as of the end of the regular season

Regular season
 Player of the Year: Lehmon Colbert (UCC Demons)
 Young Player of the Year: Sean Flood (Templeogue)
 Coach of the Year: Brian O'Malley (Killester)
 All-Star First Picks:
 Michael Bonaparte (Templeogue)
 Lehmon Colbert (UCC Demons)
 Duane Johnson (DCU Saints)
 Jermaine Turner (Killester)
 Shawn Vanzant (Belfast Star)
 All-Star Second Picks:
 Staats Battle (UL Eagles)
 Paul Dick (Killester)
 Sean Flood (Templeogue)
 Dan James (UCD Marian)
 Isaac Westbrooks (Swords Thunder)
 All-Star Third Picks:
 Paul Cummins (Templeogue)
 Conor Grace (Templeogue)
 Jason Killeen (Templeogue)
 Dustan Moreira (UCD Marian)
 Mārtiņš Provizors (DCU Saints)

References

Irish
Super League (Ireland) seasons
Basket
Basket